The 2003–04 NBA season was the 28th season for the Denver Nuggets in the National Basketball Association, and their 37th season as a franchise. The season saw the team draft future All-Star Carmelo Anthony with the third overall pick in the 2003 NBA draft. During the offseason, the team signed free agent Andre Miller, and re-signed former Nuggets guard Voshon Lenard. Coming off with the worst record of 17–65 the previous season, Anthony led the Nuggets to a fast start winning 13 of their first 19 games. However, the team struggled down the stretch posting losing records in February and March. The Nuggets finished sixth in the Midwest Division with a 43–39 record, and made the playoffs for the first time since 1995.  Anthony had a stellar rookie season averaging 21.0 points per game, and being selected to the All-Rookie First Team. He also finished second behind LeBron James of the Cleveland Cavaliers in Rookie of The Year voting.

However, in the first round of the playoffs, the Nuggets lost to the top-seeded Minnesota Timberwolves and league MVP Kevin Garnett in five games.

For the season, the Nuggets changed their logo and uniforms, adding gold and light blue to their color scheme, they remained their primary logo until 2008 their added dark navy blue to their color scheme and remained in used until 2018, while the uniforms they remained in used until 2015.

NBA Draft

Roster

Regular season

Season standings

Record vs. opponents

Game log

Playoffs

|- align="center" bgcolor="#ffcccc"
| 1
| April 18
| @ Minnesota
| L 92–106
| Anthony, Camby (19)
| Marcus Camby (8)
| Earl Boykins (5)
| Target Center18,503
| 0–1
|- align="center" bgcolor="#ffcccc"
| 2
| April 21
| @ Minnesota
| L 81–95
| Voshon Lenard (24)
| Carmelo Anthony (9)
| Anthony, Nenê (3)
| Target Center18,101
| 0–2
|- align="center" bgcolor="#ccffcc"
| 3
| April 24
| Minnesota
| W 107–86
| Carmelo Anthony (24)
| Marcus Camby (16)
| Andre Miller (6)
| Pepsi Center19,713
| 1–2
|- align="center" bgcolor="#ffcccc"
| 4
| April 27
| Minnesota
| L 82–84
| Voshon Lenard (28)
| Marcus Camby (14)
| Marcus Camby (5)
| Pepsi Center19,694
| 1–3
|- align="center" bgcolor="#ffcccc"
| 5
| April 30
| @ Minnesota
| L 91–102
| Camby, Miller (21)
| Marcus Camby (15)
| Boykins, Lenard (4)
| Target Center19,890
| 1–4
|-

Player statistics

Regular season

Playoffs

Player Statistics Citation:

Awards, records, and honors
 Carmelo Anthony, NBA All-Rookie Team 1st Team

Transactions

References

 Nuggets on Basketball Reference

Denver Nuggets seasons
Denver Nuggets
Denver Nuggets
Denver Nug